Tischeria zestica is a moth of the  family Tischeriidae. It is known from South Africa (it was described from Pretoria).

The larvae feed on Grewia occidentalis. They probably mine the leaves of their host plant.

References

Endemic moths of South Africa
Tischeriidae
Moths of Africa
Moths described in 1911